Avremesnil is a commune in the Seine-Maritime department in the Normandy region in northern France.

Geography

Heraldry

Population

Places of interest
 The church of St. Aubin, dating from the twelfth century.
 The sixteenth century manorhouse.
 The motte and other vestiges of the medieval chateau.

See also
Communes of the Seine-Maritime department

References

External links

 The official website of the commune 

Communes of Seine-Maritime